Maximiliano Perg Schneider (born 16 September 1991) is an Uruguayan professional footballer who plays as a centre-back for Uruguayan Primera División side Nacional.

Career

Fénix
He signed for Atlético Fénix in 2011

Penarol
In 2016 he signed for Peñarol

Deportivo Toluca
On 27 July 2017, Perg signed for Deportivo Toluca of the Liga MX, he was assigned shirt number 4. He scored his first goal with on August 27 against Puebla.

Defensor Sporting
On 27 December 2018, Perg signed with Defensor Sporting.

References

External links
Profile at Defensor Sporting

1991 births
Living people
Uruguayan footballers
Uruguayan expatriate footballers
Association football defenders
Footballers from Paysandú
Centro Atlético Fénix players
Peñarol players
Deportivo Toluca F.C. players
Defensor Sporting players
Club Puebla players
Querétaro F.C. footballers
Club Nacional de Football players
Liga MX players
Uruguayan Primera División players
Uruguayan expatriate sportspeople in Mexico
Expatriate footballers in Mexico